Patrick Rastner (born 30 June 1993) is an Italian luger who competed in the men's double event at the 2014 Winter Olympics in Sochi as a pair with Ludwig Rieder. The duo placed seventh.

Personal life
Rastner was born on 30 June 1993 in Brixen (Bressanone), Bolzano-Bozen, Italy.

Luge career
In 2011 he won a gold medal with Ludwig Rieder at the under-23 World Championships in  Cesana, Italy.
 
Rastner represented Italy at the 2014 Winter Olympics, held in Sochi, Russia. Competing in the men's doubles luge event alongside Rieder, he finished seventh overall. The pair were eighth after the first run but improved their position after finishing fifth fastest in the second run.

In the open double luge event at the 2018 Winter Olympics in PyeongChang, Rastner and Rieder placed 15th.

References

External links
 

Italian male lugers
Living people
Lugers at the 2014 Winter Olympics
Lugers at the 2018 Winter Olympics
Olympic lugers of Italy
1993 births
Sportspeople from Brixen
Italian lugers